The politics of the Faroe Islands, an autonomous country of the Kingdom of Denmark, function within the framework of a parliamentary, representative democratic dependency, whereby the Prime Minister of the Faroe Islands is the head of government, and of a multi-party system. The Faroe Islands are politically associated with the Kingdom of Denmark but have been self-governing since 1948. Executive power is exercised by the government. Legislative power is vested in both the government and the Løgting. The judiciary is independent of the executive and the legislature and the responsibility of Denmark. As of October 25, 2007, the Faroe Islands became one electoral district.

Executive branch

|Queen
|Margrethe II of Denmark 
|
|14 January 1972
|-
|High Commissioner
|Lene Moyell Johansen
|
|May 15, 2017
|-
|Prime Minister
|Bárður á Steig Nielsen
|Union Party
|16 September 2019
|}

The high commissioner is appointed by the Monarch of Denmark. The High Commissioner has a seat in the Løgting, with the ability to speak in the Løgting regarding common Danish/Faroese affairs, but is unable to vote. Following legislative elections, the leader of the party that wins the most seats is usually given the initiative to establish a new coalition by the Faroese Parliament, unless the current Løgmaður (Prime Minister in English) is still in power. However, if he or she fails, the Chairman of the parliament asks all chairmen of the parties elected to the parliament, and asks them to point to another chairman who they feel can rightly form a new coalition. The chairman with the most votes is then handed the initiative. After forming the coalition, the Løgmaður leads the landsstýri. The landsstýri will often consist of around 7 members. The coalition parties divide the various ministries among themselves and after this, the parties elect their representative to these ministries. Any other member of the cabinet is called a landsstýrismaður if the person is a man, or landsstýriskvinna if the person is a woman. The word ráðharri is also used for a member of the cabinet, i.e. mentamálaráðharri (minister of culture) or heilsumálaráðharri (minister of health).

Current government
Following the 2019 Faroese general election, a new government, consisting of three parties (Union Party, People's Party, and Centre Party) under Prime Minister Bárður á Steig Nielsen was created

Legislative branch
The Faroese Parliament (Løgtingið in Faroese) has 33 MPs (members of parliament), elected for a four-year term by proportional representation.

Election of 2 seats to the Danish Parliament was last held 31 october 2022: Social Democrat 1, Unionist 1.

Political parties and elections

The Faroe Islands have a multi-party system (disputing on independence and unionism as well as left and right), with numerous parties in which no one party often has a chance of gaining power alone, and parties must work with each other to form coalition governments. The Faroese Parliament (Løgting) has 33 seats. Members are elected by popular vote to serve four-year terms. For the Løgting elections, there were seven electoral districts, each one comprehending asýslur, while Streymoy is divided into northern and southern parts (Tórshavn region), but since 2008, the Faroes constitute a single district.

Administrative divisions
The islands are administratively divided into 29 municipalities with about 120 cities and villages.

Traditionally, there are also the 6 sýslur (Norðoyar, Eysturoy, Streymoy, Vágar, Sandoy, and Suðuroy). Sýsla means district and although it is only a police district today, it is still commonly understood as a geographical region. In earlier times, each sýsla had its own ting, the so-called várting (spring ting).

International affairs
The nation continues to be intimately tied with the Nordic countries of Europe and the European Union. 
Along with diplomatic missions to Iceland, the Court of St. James's (United Kingdom), Russia, and the European Union, the Faroe Islands participate in the Nordic Council, NIB, International Maritime Organization, International Whaling Commission (Complete list of participation of the Faroe Islands in international organisations).

Further reading

 Debes, Hans Jacob. 1988. "Reflections on the Position, Participation and Co-Operation of Small Nations in International Politics Case The Faroe Islands". Nordic Journal of International Law. 573: 365–368.

See also

Cabinet of the Faroe Islands
List of lawmen and prime ministers of the Faroe Islands
Politics of Denmark
List of High Commissioners of the Faroe Islands

References

External links
Prime Minister’s Office